Live at the Marquee is a season of music concerts and other live performance events organised by Aiken Promotions in a large marquee in Cork, Ireland, every summer since 2005.  For about a month in June and July, a concert is held most evenings; tickets for each night are sold separately, with varying lineups and pricing. Acts have represented many genres of popular music, including rock, folk, electronic, hip hop, rhythm and blues, and country; as well as stand-up comedy acts. 

The first season was part of Cork's 2005 year as European Capital of Culture. It proved successful enough to be repeated annually. The venue for the first two years was the Cork Showgrounds, then owned by the Munster Agricultural Society. When the Showgrounds were acquired by the Munster GAA for its redevelopment of the adjoining Páirc Uí Chaoimh stadium, Live at the Marquee moved to an adjacent site previously used by Ford as a vehicle distribution centre. In 2018 National Asset Management Agency (NAMA), which had acquired the site after the 2008 economic crash, announced that it would be selling it. Aiken Promotions said it would seek an alternative site for further seasons of Live at the Marquee. The 2020 event was cancelled as part of the response to the COVID-19 pandemic in Ireland.

The event has attracted many well-known names in the music industry to perform including Little Mix, Elton John, JLS, Ellie Goulding, 50 Cent, Diana Ross, Bob Dylan, Kanye West, Lady Gaga, The Script, Pink, Christy Moore, Jason Derulo, Eric Clapton, Flo Rida, Jay-Z, Morrissey, Neil Young, Paul Simon, Anastacia, Jessie J, Olly Murs, Steps, Meat Loaf, Ke$ha, Picture This, Jedward, Ne-yo, Snoop Dogg, Lana Del Rey, Alexandra Burke and Sting.

Previous years

2005 

The 2005 festival was a two-week affair combining music and comedy and took place in a specially designed marquee designed by Kellie Clarke marquees (with a capacity of 4,000) in the Cork Showgrounds between 30 June and 17 July. Beach Boy Brian Wilson launched the Cork 2005 Marquee with his first ever appearance in the city of Cork. 2005 performances included:

 Brian Wilson – 30 June
 Aslan with special guest George Murphy – 1 July
 Brian McFadden – 2 July
 Diana Ross – 3 July
 Gipsy Kings – 4 July
 Al Green with special guests Gabrielle and Amos Lee – 5 July
 Nick Cave – 6 July
 Van Morrison – 7 July
 Paul Brady with special guest Cara Dillon – 8 July
 Tommy Tiernan – 10 July
 Dwight Yoakam with special guest BR5-49 – 12 July
 Paddy Casey with special guest Declan O'Rourke – 14 July
 Damien Dempsey with special guests The Frank and Walters & Fred −15 July
 Ronan Keating – 16 July
 Christy Moore – 17 July
 McFly

2006 

Live at the Marquee 2006 took place in the Cork Showgrounds between June and July. Headlining acts included Bob Dylan, Roger Waters, The Frames and Des Bishop. The 2006 festival featured:
 Christy Moore – 23 June
 David Gray with Simple Kid – 24 June
 Bob Dylan – 25 June
 Art Garfunkel – 28 June
 Roger Waters – 29 June
 The Frames – 30 June
 Kanye West – 2 July
 Kanye West – 3 July
 Robert Plant with Revere – 5 July
 Roxy Music with Jodavino – 6 July
 Des Bishop – 7 July

2007 

It was decided that in 2007 the event would relocate to The Docklands on Centre Park Road in Cork. Bell X1 frontman Paul Noonan later said of their 2007 performance, "Without doubt, the Marquee gig in 2007 was one of the best gigs of our entire Flock tour. We had played venues like The Lobby, The Savoy and the Opera House, but being asked to play the Marquee was a crowning moment for us". The 2007 festival lineup included:
 Faithless – 20 June
 Antony and the Johnsons – 21 June
 Comedy Circus – 23 June (CANCELLED)
 Podge and Rodge – 24 June
 Slayer – 26 June
 Cascada – 28 June
 Duran Duran – 29 June
 The Who – 30 June
 Bell X1 – 1 July
 Status Quo – 2 July
 The Flaming Lips – 3 July
 50 Cent – 4 July
 Madness – 5 July
 Christy Moore with Declan Sinnott – 7 July
 Elton John – 9 July
 Lionel Richie – 11 July

2008 

The 2008 festival took place from 18 June until 7 July. Shayne Ward opened the festival and Pink returned to close it. Christy Moore returned for a fourth year whilst comedian Tommy Tiernan was originally going to perform on 3 July, but agreed to put his gig back a day to accommodate Paul Simon who was only available to perform on the 3rd. The 2008 festival lineup included:
 Shayne Ward – 18–19 June
 Eric Clapton – 20 June
 Dolly Parton – 21 June
 Lou Reed – 23 June
 Jay-Z – 25 June
 Morrissey – 26 June
 Christy Moore – 28 June
 Meat Loaf – 29 June
 Neil Young – 30 June
 Massive Attack – 1 July
 Tommy Tiernan – 2 July
 Paul Simon – 3 July
 Tommy Tiernan – 4 July
 Tommy Tiernan – 5 July
 Paul Weller – 6 July
 Pink – 7 July

2009 

The 2009 festival was launched on 28 November 2008, with the announcement of The Prodigy, Gilbert O'Sullivan, Kasabian, Christy Moore, Josh Ritter and Rod Stewart. On 19 February 2009, a further set of acts were announced – including: Blondie, Simple Minds, Crosby, Stills & Nash, Bell X1, Des Bishop, Mick Flannery/John Spillane, Boyzone and Anastacia. Flo Rida was announced on 9 April 2009. The line-up included:

 Blondie – 17 June [CANCELLED – "due to circumstances out of the organiser's control"]
 The Priests – 17 June
 The Prodigy – 18 June
 Gilbert O'Sullivan – 20 June
 Kasabian – 21 June [CANCELLED – due to "promotional commitments"]
 Tracy Chapman – 22 June
 Chickenfoot – 23 June
 Flo Rida – 24 June
 Simple Minds – 25 June
 Bell X1 – 26 June
 Christy Moore – 27 June
 Boyzone – 28 June
 Crosby, Stills & Nash – 29 June
 Anastacia – 30 June
 Lady Gaga- 1 July
 Josh Ritter with support from Lisa Hannigan – 4 July
 Des Bishop – 5 July
 Ne-Yo – 6 July
 Rod Stewart – 7 July
 Kanye West with support from Kid Cudi – 8 July
 Mick Flannery/John Spillane – 9 July
 50 Cent – 10 July

2010 

Hot Press put together a "special guide" for the festival. The 2010 festival included:

Megadeth – 14 June
Chris Brown – 15 June [CANCELLED – due to problems with work visa's]
JLS – 16 June.
JLS – 17 June.
Al Green and Michael McDonald –  19 June.
Kenny Rogers – 20 June.
Jackson Browne and David Lindley – 23 June.
Blondie – 24 June
Midlake, Camera Obscura, Grizzly Bear and Villagers – 25 June.
Horslips – 26 June [CANCELLED – due to sudden illness of Jim Lockhart]
Paul Weller – 27 June
The Cranberries – 29 June
Deep Purple –  30 June
Dara Ó Briain –  1 July
Dara Ó Briain –  2 July
Christy Moore and Declan Sinnott – 3 July.
Snoop Dogg – 5 July
Westlife – 6 July
Westlife – 7 July (Announced after previous date sold out within minutes)
Tony Bennett – 8 July
Madness – 9 July
Mamma Mia! – from 20 July until 1 August (16 Shows)

2011 

Aiken Promotions announced the first round of acts for the 2011 festival on 26 November 2010. On 31 January 2011, The Frames were announced, followed by Grinderman being announced on 2 February, with Erasure added to the line-up on 14 February. Fleet Foxes were announced as the 10th act for the festival, and Bob Dylan, Tom Jones, Katherine Lynch, Westlife, Paul Simon and a second Imelda May show where added on 7 March. Lil Wayne was added to the line-up on 25 March but this was later cancelled as issues with work permits in the UK caused Lil Wayne's European tour to be cancelled. Katherine Lynch's show was moved to the Cork Opera House. The line-up was:
 The Frames – 11 June
 Erasure – 15 June
 Bob Dylan – 16 June
 Imelda May – 17 June
 Katherine Lynch – 18 June [CANCELLED]
 Tom Jones – 19 June
 Grinderman – 20 June [CANCELLED]
 Paul Simon – 21 June
 Bryan Adams – 22 June
 Imelda May – 23 June (SOLD OUT)
 Alexandra Burke – 24 June
 Christy Moore – 25 June
 Fleet Foxes – 26 June
 Elton John & Band – 28 June
 Bell X1 – 1 July
 Jedward – 2 July
 Jedward (second date) – 23 July.
 Lil Wayne – 4 July [CANCELLED]
 Westlife – 9 July

2012 
Aiken Promotions officially announced the first act for the 2012 festival on 7 November 2011, with Christy Moore performing alongside Declan Sinnott on 23 June 2012. 2012 marked the eight consecutive year Christy Moore performed at the festival. Jedward were announced on 18 November. Justice was announced as the third act confirmed for Live at the Marquee on 25 November. Dara O'Briain also made a return to the Marquee in 2012 with 2 dates. Tom Petty & The Heartbreakers were announced on 14 December, as well as shows for The Coronas and Olly Murs. The Ireland team's matches in UEFA Euro 2012 were shown in the marquee. The full line-up included:
 Justice – 7 June
 Tom Petty & The Heartbreakers – 8 June
 Imelda May – 9 June
 Republic of Ireland -V- Croatia – 10 June
 The Specials – 11 June
 Spain -V- Republic of Ireland – 14 June
 The Coronas – 15 June 
 Italy -V- Republic of Ireland – 18 June
 Christy Moore and Declan Sinnott – 23 June
 Jedward – 24 & 30 June
 Dara Ó Briain – 28 & 29 June
 Jessie J – 1 & 3 July
 Olly Murs – 4 & 5 July
 Steps – 6 July

2013 
The first acts of Live at the Marquee 2013 were announced by Aiken Promotions on 10 December 2012 with ZZ Top, Elton John, Elvis Costello and Christy Moore announced for the festival. The Coronas were announced as the 5th act to perform at LATM 2013. The projected line-up included:

Olly Murs – 12 June
Little Mix – 14 June 
The Wanted – 16 June 
The Coronas – 22 June
Elton John – 23 June 
Elvis Costello & The Imposters – 26 June 
ZZ Top – 27 June
The National – 28 June 
The Coronas – 29 June 
Sting – 1 July
Passenger – 2 July  
Ke$ha – 3 July
Bell X1 – 4 July
The Boomtown Rats – 5 July
Christy Moore – 6 July
Jessie J – 7 July
Imelda May – 9 July

2014 
In late 2013 and early 2014, several acts were announced for the 2014 event, including:
Cliff Richard – 9 June
Dolly Parton – 12 June
The Coronas – 13 June
Bob Dylan – 16 June
Tom Jones – 19 June
Imelda May – 21 June 
Elbow – 24 June
Robert Plant & The Sensational Space Shifters – 25 June 
Jason Derulo – 26 June
Biffy Clyro – 27 June   
Bryan Adams – 28 June
Pixies – 30 June 
The Prodigy – 2 July
Christy Moore – 5 July
Paolo Nutini - 8 July 
Neil Young & Crazy Horse – 10 July
Shane Filan - 11 July 
Mario Rosenstock - 12 July
The National – 14 July
Lana Del Rey – 15 July

2015
Acts for the 2015 event included:
Beck - 16 June
Billy Idol - 17 June
The Coronas - 19 June
Nathan Carter - 21 June
ZZ Top - 22 June
Ellie Goulding - 24 June
Kodaline - 25 June
Lionel Richie - 27 June
The Waterboys - 28 June
Dara Ó Briain - 3 July
Christy Moore - 4 July
Van Morrison - 9 July
Status Quo - 12 July
Damien Rice - 13 July
Noel Gallagher's High Flying Birds - 14 July

2016
The 2016 festival (15 June to 13 July) was scheduled to include performances from Slayer, Anthrax, Tom Jones, Imelda May, Chic featuring Nile Rodgers, Little Mix, Olly Murs, The Coronas, Nathan Carter and The Pixies.

2017
Acts, appearing from 9 June to 14 July, included Elton John, Eddie Vedder, Elbow, Cliff Richard, Frankie Valli & the Four Seasons, Bryan Adams, Idina Menzel (cancelled), Emeli Sandé (cancelled), The Coronas, Picture This, Walking on Cars, Nathan Carter, RTÉ 2fm Live with Jenny Greene and the RTÉ Concert Orchestra, Gavin James, Christy Moore, Tommy Tiernan, and Al Porter.

2018
Acts, appearing from 7 June to 14 July, included A-Ha, Don McLean, Bell X1, Gavin James, CHIC featuring Nile Rodgers, Picture This, Jenny Greene and the RTÉ Concert Orchestra, The Script, James Bay, Christy Moore, Nathan Carter, Jack Johnson,  Alanis Morissette, Kraftwerk, and The Coronas.

2019
The lineup for the 2019 event included Aslan, Toto, Kris Kristofferson, The Academic, Christy Moore, David Gray, and Hall & Oates.

2022

2022 is due to be the last time the festival plays at its current location on the Monahan Road in Cork's docklands. Artists set to perform include: 
 The Coronas - May 27
 Tom Grennan - May 31
 Simply Red - June 1
 Riverdance - June 2 to June 5
 The National - June 6
 John Bishop - June 9 and 10
 Olly Murs - June 11
 Deadmau5 - June 17
 Orbital - June 18
 Sinead O'Connor - June 19
 Pet Shop Boys - June 22
 Dara O'Briain - June 23
 Christy Moore - June 25
 Crowded House - June 27
 Olivia Rodrigo - June 29. Rodrigo is expected to serve as the headliner and finale for the festival at its present location.

References

External links
 Official Ticketmaster site

2000s in Irish music
2010s in Irish music
Music in Cork (city)
Music festivals in Ireland
Tourist attractions in Cork (city)